Doolittle Bluff is the large rock bluff at the head of Suess Glacier, on the north side of Taylor Valley, Victoria Land. It was named by the Advisory Committee on Antarctic Names (1997) after John H. (Jack) Doolittle, an American physicist who was: Station Science Leader at Siple Station, winter party 1977; Research Scientist at the Lockheed Martin Palo Alto Research Laboratory, Space Physics Laboratory, from 1983; and Staff Physicist there from 1993; a continuous participant as a South Pole co-investigator in auroral studies since 1983; and made 20 working visits to Antarctica (McMurdo, Siple and South Pole Stations) from the 1975–76 season.

References 

Cliffs of Victoria Land
McMurdo Dry Valleys

Doolittle Bluff is the ridge on the left that rises above the Suess Glacier which spills into Taylor dry valley.